Prince Axel of Denmark,  (Danish: Prins Axel Christian Georg til Danmark; 12 August 1888 – 14 July 1964) was a member of the Danish royal family. He was the second son of Prince Valdemar of Denmark and Princess Marie of Orléans, and a grandson of King Christian IX of Denmark.

On his father's side, he was a first cousin of King Christian X of Denmark, King Haakon VII of Norway and his wife Queen Maud, King Constantine I of Greece, King George V of the United Kingdom, Emperor Nicholas II of Russia, Ernest Augustus III, Duke of Brunswick and Prince Andrew of Greece and Denmark, father of Prince Philip, Duke of Edinburgh, and on his mother's side of Henri, Count of Paris (1908–1999), Orleanist pretender to the French throne.

Prince Axel was a popular patron of sports. He was a prominent International Olympic Committee member and activist and also a business executive. In 1963, Prince Axel became the first honorary member of the IOC in history. He was an officer in the Royal Danish Navy.

Life and family

Early life and military career

Prince Axel was born on 12 August 1888, in the Yellow Palace, an 18th-century town house at 18 Amaliegade, immediately adjacent to the Amalienborg Palace complex in Copenhagen. He was the second child of Prince Valdemar of Denmark, and his wife Princess Marie of Orléans. His father was a younger son of King Christian IX of Denmark and Louise of Hesse-Kassel, and his mother was the eldest daughter of Prince Robert, Duke of Chartres and Princess Françoise of Orléans. His parents' marriage was said to be a political match.

Prince Axel served in the navy and gained the rank of admiral.

Marriage and family
On 22 May 1919, he married Princess Margaretha of Sweden, his first cousin once removed and the eldest daughter of Prince Carl, Duke of Västergötland. The wedding took place in the Cathedral of Stockholm and was celebrated with great festivities around the city. Princess Margaretha's mother, Princess Ingeborg of Denmark, was Prince Axel's paternal first cousin, as they shared the royal grandfather, King Christian IX of Denmark. The marriage was a love match and the bride's mother remarked that the couple were so much in love that they could not be left alone in a furnished room. He was the only one of his parents' sons to contract an equal marriage.
Prince Axel and Princess Margaretha had two sons:
Prince George Valdemar Carl Axel (16 April 1920 – 29 September 1986) he married Anne Bowes-Lyon on 16 September 1950.
Prince Flemming Valdemar Carl Axel (9 March 1922 – 19 June 2002) he married Alice Nielson on 24 May 1949. They had four children.

Bernstorff
The couple was given the Bernstorffshøj, a villa located near Bernstorff Palace in Gentofte, outside Copenhagen, as their wedding gift and settled there immediately in 1919. The Bernstorff estate was the residence of Prince Valdemar and his family, inherited by him from his father, Christian IX, in 1906. The Bernstorffshøj was the birthplace of Prince Axel and Princess Margaretha's elder son, Georg Valdemar, in 1920. In 1922, the Prince lost most of his money when the Landmandsbanken collapsed. In June 1936 the original 19th-century house was seriously damaged by a fire caused by a maid leaving an electric iron plugged into a socket. After that accident, Prince Axel rebuilt it on a grander scale. He chose Helweg Møller as the main architect. Møller's logo, a star, appears on the door handles and other places in the home. Prince Axel had been a naval officer and the house was designed to evoke being on a ship, with the bridge situated on the top terrace and the compass set into the marble in the front hall. After the death of Prince Valdemar in 1939, the right to use the whole Bernstorff estate passed to Prince Axel, but he chose to remain in the more modest Bernstorffshøj. Since he ceased to use the palace and until very recently, it was used by the Danish Emergency Management Agency as an academy for non-commissioned officers. However, the Prince petitioned the government to permit him and his family to be buried on the grounds of the Palace.

During the German occupation of Denmark during the World War II, the Bernstorffshøj villa was the meeting place for members of the Danish Resistance and the neighbouring Brødrehøj was used as an arsenal for the Resistance. This led to Prince Axel being put under house arrest for a while.

After the death of Princess Margaretha in 1977, the site of her and Prince Axel's residence in Bernstorff was bought in 1978 by the British Government and became the residence of Britain's ambassador in Denmark. The new occupants maintain the late princely couple's private library in situ. It contains a significant number of books about fishing and sailing, most of them in English and Danish. Some of the books contain written inscriptions to Prince Axel from other European royalty.

Death and burial
Prince Axel lived with his wife, Princess Margaretha, at the Bernstorffshøj villa until his death. He died on 14 July 1964 in Bispebjerg Hospitalet, Bispebjerg. His wife died on 4 January 1977 in Tranemosegård, Kongsted near Fakse. They are both buried on the grounds of Bernstorff Palace, alongside their sons and daughters-in law.

Official duties and interests
Prince Axel and Princess Margaretha accompanied Crown Prince Frederik and Prince Knud on their extensive tour of Asia in 1930. Prince Axel was one of the godparents of future Queen Margrethe II of Denmark at her baptism on 14 May 1940 in the Church of Holmen in Copenhagen. In 1947, Prince Axel and Princess Margaretha, together with their sons, Princes Georg and Flemming, were among the official guests at the wedding of Princess Elizabeth, the future Queen Elizabeth II of the United Kingdom, and Philip, Duke of Edinburgh (the former Prince Philip of Greece and Denmark). On September 4, 1948, Prince Axel represented King Frederick IX at the inauguration of Queen Juliana of the Netherlands. In 1953, Prince Axel and Princess Margaretha represented the King at the coronation of Elizabeth II. As a result of the Danish Act of Succession of 1953, which restricts the throne to those descended from Christian X and his wife, Alexandrine of Mecklenburg-Schwerin, through approved marriages, he lost his place in the line of succession.

Sports
Prince Axel was a popular figure in Denmark, involved in the promotion and development of sports as well as business. He was a longtime member of the International Olympic Committee for Denmark. At the 55th IOC Session in Tokyo in 1958, Prince Axel, a member of the IOC taking part in the session, officially proposed making the work composed by Spyridon Samaras the official Olympic anthem. Prince Axel was a prominent member of the IOC and he openly supported Lord Porritt's proposal of limiting the age of the Committee members to 70 since the St. Moritz session in 1948. However, the proposals were not accepted by the majority of the committee and they were finally implemented in 1966. For his services to the Olympic movement, he was awarded unanimously the Olympic Order of Merit in 1963. Since his election as a member of the IOC in 1932, Prince Axel travelled over 160,000 kilometres around the world in advance of his duties. In 31 years of his active service in the committee, the Prince missed only one of its sessions. In 1963, Prince Axel was nominated to become the first honorary member of the IOC.

Prince Axel was a pioneer of motor sports in Denmark, president of the Royal Danish Automobile Club from 1920 until 1938. The prince held Denmark's number 10 pilot's licence, acquired in 1912.

Business
Prince Axel was a member of the Board and for some time Chairman of the Board of the SAS, Scandinavian Airlines System. In 1937 he succeeded Hans Niels Andersen, the founder of the East Asiatic Company, as its Chairman of the Board and managing director. The Prince stopped managing the company in 1953, but retained the position of the Chairman until his death in 1964. In 1948, during his visit to Melbourne, Australia as an IOC member and an executive of the 1956 Summer Olympics organising committee, he discussed also widely possible expansion of the SAS air business in Australia, in his capacity as a member of the board of the company.

Honours
Danish orders and decorations
 Knight of the Order of the Elephant, 12 August 1906
 Cross of Honour of the Order of the Dannebrog, 12 August 1906
 Grand Commander of the Order of the Dannebrog, 26 March 1947
 King Christian IX and Queen Louise of Denmark Golden Wedding Commemorative Medal
 King Christian IX Centenary Medal
 Navy Long Service Medal

Foreign orders and decorations

Military appointments
 Admiral in the Royal Danish Navy

Other honours
 Olympic Diploma of Merit, 1963

Ancestry

References

Citations

Bibliography

External links

 Prince Axel's obituary in the Olympic Review, 1964.

Danish princes
House of Glücksburg (Denmark)
International Olympic Committee members
1888 births
1964 deaths
Recipients of the Cross of Honour of the Order of the Dannebrog
Grand Commanders of the Order of the Dannebrog
Grand Croix of the Légion d'honneur
Recipients of the Order of the Rising Sun with Paulownia Flowers
Recipients of the Order of the Netherlands Lion
Grand Crosses of the Order of Polonia Restituta
Honorary Knights Grand Cross of the Royal Victorian Order
20th-century Danish naval officers